Alessandro "Alex" Palmieri (born January 12, 1991) is an Italian singer, songwriter, performer and LGBT activist. He reached media popularity thanks to internet activities and different TV programs. He released 1 Ep, 3 albums and 20 singles.

Biography 
Palmieri has studied dance since he was six and he appeared for the first time in TV in 2010 during Pomeriggio Cinque, a TV show with Barbara D'Urso on Canale 5. In 2011 his first single Move were released. He reached fame and media renown thanks to his performances in several discos, TV appearances (including an interview on La3) TV and online activities. In 2011 he took part in the second edition of the Social King reality show on Rai 2, classifying himself among the four final contenders. During the running period of this TV show the single Popstar was released thanks to the cooperation with the Swedish DJ Tim Bergholm. Later, during the promotional tour, he also presented the song on Match Music TV.

After having released other singles and after several performances in Italian discos, Palmieri released the single Monster Boy at the end of 2012, produced by Ukrainian Jandy Andrey Prudnikov and in 2013 he performed at gay pride in Milan. This song was also broadcast on the Italian TV network Sky Sport during the program Calcio Mercato presented by Alessandro Bonan. In autumn of that year he signed his first record deal with Believe Digital and he published the album Back Alive, co-produced by Bergholm and Prudnikov and anticipated by the first single Wasted. Later Palmieri performed on tour around Italy in clubs and as a guest at events related to gay prides. Moreover, he published other singles from the album, always followed by music videos.

In November 2014 he published the first single from his new album, Maniac. This was the video that opened the singer's official Vevo channel and in 2015 he performed during the Verona Pride supporting Ivana Spagna and Power Francers. In November 2015 the album Uncensored was released, it was produced by Believe Digital. The single Nicholas' Got a Secret came out before the album and was produced by Palmieri and Prudnikov with the participation of Luca Sala. The tour that followed was the first one with dates around Europe, for instance during Regenbogenparade in Vienna, at CSD München, at Warsaw Pride and at Copenhagen Pride. Simultaneously to the European tour, two singles were extracted from the album: Single and Save Me.

In September 2016 Palmieri was one of the love interests in the dating game show Uomini e Donne on Canale 5 during the first gay edition where he stayed for one month, in the same period he renewed his contract with Believe Digital and in November he released the single Online. This song was broadcast in preview on Swiss TV RSI La 2. In 2017, the videoclip of ″Online″ was broadcast in airplay on TV channels OutTV in Belgium and in the Netherlands. Afterwards, the national tour aimed at the promotion of the song, starting from Cagliari and continuing in several other Italian cities. In summer 2017 the tour continued in Europe with three dates in Germany (Konstanz, Mannheim e Düsseldorf), followed by Florence, Budapest and London, marking the singer's first time in the UK: the performance in Trafalgar Square was part of the London Pride, supporting Fleur East gig and where the singer was also interviewed by London Live. Concurrently with the live shows, Palmieri confirmed the making of a new album and in October 2017 the first single But Nobody Knows for the forthcoming album was released. The song was produced between Italy and California by the producer Johann Bach and in November the news agency Adnkronos published the videoclip première.

In January 2018 Alex Palmieri released his second album with Believe Digital entitled Reset, an electro-pop work inspired by the sound of the 2000s and for which, once again, Palmieri wrote all the lyrics. The album included the previous single Online and But Nobody Knows and it's been recorded in Italy, Ukraine, Sweden and California, with the help of Alex's fans, who helped to raise money for the production thanks to a Crowdfunding campaign. The release of the album was accompanied by the third single Time Resetted (produced together with Alex Zitelli and Livio Boccioni) and followed by a few TV appearances: the singer presented the album on TG Norba 24, on the Swiss channel RSI La 2 and on Rai 1, on the television programme Unomattina. In March, during an interview on Radio 105 Network, where Palmieri announces the first Italian dates of the Reset Tour. In summer 2018, live shows have been extended in Europe with gigs in Germany, Poland and Spain  and in September a 4th single from Reset was released, the song against bullying If That Was You. The ballad gathered a positive media attention: in October it was premiered on the Raiuno TV programme Storie Italiane (Italian Stories), hosted by Eleonora Daniele and later on, the channel Rete 4 broadcast a sneak preview of the music video. In January 2019, Palmieri released the last single from Reset, the dance/pop track In the Backstage which he performed on TV, on Raiuno on the programme Unomattina. and in February he announced a repise of the Reset Tour with other 7 Italian dates. That summer the Reset Tour went back in Europe, with its conclusive dates in Germany (Munich and Hamburg), Czech Republic (Prague) and Austria where Alex was the only Italian singer to take the stage of EuroPride 2019 in Wien. In the meantime, he confirmed the processing of a new music project  and in December, during an interview on TG Norba 24 Palmieri announces the release date of the new album Wrong in 2020.

In January 2020 the new album Wrong came out, it was anticipated by the first single Fake News (which had come out the previous October). The sound of the album, worked between Italy, Ukraine, California and Philippines, is pop with hints of trap and K-pop, it is definited by the singer as less commercial and more personal than previous discographic work. It was presented on Raiuno TV programme Storie Italiane (Italian Stories) hosted by Eleonora Daniele, who showed a sneak preview from the videoclip of the second single Room 05. After the music video release, Alex disclosed the Wrong Tour dates starting from Munchen, but after the first one, many stages have been cancelled due to COVID-19 plague. During the quarantine he was interviewed by Radio Rai and Rai 3 and in September the third single, the ballad Beatrice from the album Wrong, was released. This single is dedicated to women and the female emancipation and it'll be on radio airplay on BBC Radio in UK in autumn. In October Alex is interviewed by Tg3 on Rai 3 and Raiuno in the programme Unomattina, both broadcasting a preview of Beatrice music video. Video came out definitely in November for ANSA (Agenzia Nazionale Stampa Associata).
In December, Alex made his debut in Albania with several television appearances, on RTSH with an interview and on Televizioni Klan with a 10 minutes live performance on Christmas night, guest with Ornella Muti.
In the start of 2021 Alex release the 4th single from Wrong called Dangerous Scandalous  which gets a good response in Albania with interviews and previews on Televizioni Klan in the programme Rudina Magjistari, Mtv Albania and in March 2021 it's been selected for the television festival Kënga Magjike but In May the singer announce a break from music activity.

Discography

Albums 
 Back Alive (EP - 2013, Believe Digital)
 Uncensored (2015, Believe Digital)
 Reset (2018, Believe Digital)
 Wrong (2020, Believe Digital)

Singles 
 "Move" (2011)
 "Popstar" (2011)
 "Touch Me" (2012)
 "Monster Boy" (2012)
 "Wasted" (2013)
 "Back Alive" (2013)
 "Lovekiller" (2014)
 "Maniac" (2014)
 "Nicholas’ Got a Secret" (2015)
 "Single" (2015)
 "Save Me" (2016)
 "Online" (2016)
 "But Nobody Knows" (2017)
 "Time Resetted" (2018)
 "If That Was You" (2018)
 "In the Backstage" (2019)
 "Fake News" (2019)
 "Room 05" (2020)
 "Beatrice" (2020)
 "Dangerous Scandalous" (2021)

References

External links 

 

1991 births
21st-century Italian male singers
Italian LGBT rights activists
Living people
Singers from Milan
OnlyFans creators